Jo Benkow (born Josef Elias Benkowitz; 15 August 1924 – 18 May 2013) was a Norwegian politician and writer, notable for being an important person in the Conservative Party of Norway, and the President of the Parliament 1985–1993. He was also President of the Nordic Council in 1983.

Private life 
Jo Benkow was born in Trondheim, Norway to Jewish parents, Ivan Benkow (1885–1955) and Annie Louise Florence (1895–1942). The family moved to the municipality of Bærum outside Oslo when Jo was a child. Jo Benkow married Bjørg Gerda Folkestad (1930–2012) in 1952, but the marriage dissolved in 1983. From 1985 he was married to fellow politician Annelise Høegh (1948–2015), former parliamentary representative for the Conservative Party, and daughter of war aviator Anders Høegh (1920– 1989). He was the uncle of journalistic fraudster Bjørn Benkow (1940–2010). 

As a member of the tiny Jewish minority of Norway, he experienced first-hand prejudice while growing up. In 1942, he fled persecution by the Nazis occupying Norway, to Sweden. His mother and sister were deported by the Nazi regime from Norway and murdered in Auschwitz. Jo reached the United Kingdom where he served in the Royal Norwegian Air Force. He returned after the war and took up photography as a trade, his father's profession.

Political career
In 1965 he was elected to the Parliament of Norway, representing the Conservative Party. In parliament he soon became a leading figure, as party leader 1980–84, group leader of the Conservative Party in parliament 1981–85 and most notably becoming President of the Storting (Speaker) on 9 October 1985, a position he held until his retirement on 30 September 1993, after 28 years in parliament.

Benkow served as president of the International Helsinki Federation for Human Rights, taught international relations at Boston University, and has written books on human rights, modern monarchy in Norway, and other issues. His autobiography
Fra Synagogen til Løvebakken (From the synagogue to Løvebakken; Løvebakken refers to a place outside the Parliament) published in 1985 sold 250,000 copies in Norway and earned him the Norwegian Booksellers' Prize. His book Olav –  menneske og monark ("Olav – Man and Monarch"), a product of several conversations with his friend King Olav V, was a huge bestseller as well.

He was also a much sought-after lecturer on issues concerning the Middle East and Anti-Semitism. In recent years he managed to create some controversy when he criticized former prime minister and party colleague Kåre Willoch, calling him "the most biased person in the country," on account of Willoch's views on the Middle East and his criticism of Israeli politics.

Benkow died on 18 May 2013, at a hospital in Oslo, aged 88.

Awards
Defence Medal 1940–1945
Norwegian Booksellers' Prize, 1985
Grand Cross of the Order of the White Rose of Finland, 1990
Grand Decoration of Honour in Gold for Services to the Republic of Austria, 1996
Knights of the Order of St. Olav, 1998

Books
Fra synagogen til Løvebakken (1985); From Synagogue to Parliament
Folkevalgt (1988); Elected by the People
Haakon, Maud og Olav. Et minnealbum i tekst og bilder (1989); Haakon, Maud and Olav. A Memorial Album of Text and Images
Hundre år med konge og folk (1990); A Hundred Years with King and Nation
Olav – menneske og monark (1991); Olav – Man and Monarch
Det ellevte bud (1994, with afterword by Elie Wiesel); The Eleventh Commandment

References

 Article in Aftenposten, May 2004 (in Norwegian) on the Norwegian Refugee Council and Kåre Willoch's visit to Israel and the Palestinian territories.

1924 births
2013 deaths
Norwegian Jews
Presidents of the Storting
Members of the Storting
Norwegian writers
Jewish Norwegian politicians
Politicians from Trondheim
Bærum politicians
Royal Norwegian Air Force personnel of World War II
Leaders of the Conservative Party (Norway)
20th-century Norwegian politicians